Yahotyn is a city in Boryspil Raion, Kyiv Oblast (region) of Ukraine. It hosts the administration of Yahotyn urban hromada, one of the hromadas of Ukraine. In 2001, population was 23,659. The current population is 

Until 18 July 2020, Yahotyn was the administrative center of Yahotyn Raion. The raion was abolished that day as part of the administrative reform of Ukraine, which reduced the number of raions of Kyiv Oblast to seven. The area of Yahotyn Raion was merged into Boryspil Raion.

The village of Dvirkivshchyna in Boryspil Raion is birthplace to famous football player Andriy Shevchenko, who attended sports-school in Yahotyn.

Climate

References

External links
 city portal
 Church "House of Prayer" in Yahotyn
 The murder of the Jews of Yahotyn during World War II, at Yad Vashem website.

Cities in Kyiv Oblast
Piryatinsky Uyezd
Cities of district significance in Ukraine
Holocaust locations in Ukraine